Tatiana Búa (born 19 January 1990) is a former professional tennis player from Argentina.

Búa has won four singles and 24 doubles titles on the ITF Circuit. She reached best WTA rankings of world No. 372 in singles and 119 in doubles.

Búa was born in Bragado, and made her WTA Tour debut at the 2014 Morocco Open, partnering Daniela Seguel in women's doubles. The South American pair won their first-round match against Nicole Clerico and Nikola Fraňková, only to lose in the quarterfinals to the top seeds Darija Jurak and Megan Moulton-Levy. However, they reached their first final in Strasbourg the following month, losing to the three-time Grand Slam-finalist pairing of Ashleigh Barty and Casey Dellacqua.

Playing for Argentina Fed Cup team, Búa has a win–loss record of 0–2.

WTA career finals

Doubles: 1 (runner-up)

ITF Circuit finals

Singles: 12 (4–8)

Doubles: 49 (24–25)

Notes

References

External links

 
 
 

1990 births
Living people
Sportspeople from Buenos Aires Province
Argentine female tennis players
South American Games bronze medalists for Argentina
South American Games medalists in tennis
Competitors at the 2006 South American Games